Bibowee is a lake in the Nordwestmecklenburg district in Mecklenburg-Vorpommern, Germany. At an elevation of 20.1 m, its surface area is 0.79 km².

Lakes of Mecklenburg-Western Pomerania